David John Threlfall (born 12 October 1953) is an English stage, film and television actor and director. He is best known for playing Frank Gallagher in Channel 4's series Shameless. He has also directed several episodes of the show. In April 2014, he portrayed comedian Tommy Cooper in a television film entitled Tommy Cooper: Not Like That, Like This. In 2014, he starred alongside Jude Law in the thriller Black Sea. In 2022 he received a Tony Award for Best Leading Actor in a Play for his performance in the Martin McDonagh play Hangmen.

Early life
The son of a plumber, Tommy Threlfall and his wife, Joyce Foulds, David was born in Crumpsall, Manchester, Lancashire. The family lived in Blackley then moved to the Bradford area of Manchester and then Burnage when he was 8/9. His introduction to drama came from school and two English teachers, at Wilbraham High School, where he was a contemporary of the younger Lorraine Ashbourne.

He studied at Art college in Sheffield (now Sheffield Hallam University), but only stayed for a year. A few months of labouring and thinking followed. Then, having consulted a magazine in a public library which listed drama colleges, Threlfall successfully applied to Manchester Polytechnic School of Drama. By graduation, he had an audition with Mike Leigh.

Threlfall has been a supporter of Manchester City since childhood and was the voice over for the film played before every home game during the 2017–18 season.

Career
Threlfall graduated from the Manchester Polytechnic School of Theatre. He has notched up a wide range of film and television credits since his 1977 acting debut in "The Kiss of Death" (Mike Leigh). Was in the original Play for Today version of the film Scum as the eloquent Archer. Television appearances include Trevor in Mike Leigh's 1977 made-for-TV film Kiss of Death, Leslie Titmuss in Paradise Postponed, Edgar in the Granada Television production of King Lear (1983) opposite Laurence Olivier in the title role. He also had regular roles in the situation comedies Nightingales and Men of the World, and guest appearances in dramas such as Cutting It, The Knock, CI5: The New Professionals and Spooks. He played Prince Charles in Diana: Her True Story (1993) and his father Prince Philip in The Queen's Sister (2005). Threlfall played the central character of Frank Gallagher in Paul Abbott's Shameless, shown on Channel 4 for 11 series between 2004 and 2013.

He also played the role of Friedrich Kritzinger in the BBC/HBO drama Conspiracy, a dramatisation of the infamous Wannsee Conference. In 2006, he played the domineering husband of wartime diarist Nella Last, in the TV drama Housewife, 49. Film credits include John le Carré's The Russia House, Patriot Games, Master and Commander: The Far Side of the World, Elizabeth: The Golden Age, alongside Cate Blanchett, and Nowhere Boy in which he took the part of John Lennon's Uncle George.

He also had a small role in the 2006 film Alien Autopsy and played the character Martin Blower in the 2007 film Hot Fuzz, acting alongside Simon Pegg and Nick Frost. He starred in an episode of The Whistle Blowers. He starred as the lead role in the fifth episode of the BBC docu-drama series Ancient Rome: The Rise and Fall of an Empire as the Emperor Constantine I.

Threlfall voiced the part of Iago in Othello for the Arcangel audio production of same. He also voiced the detective Paolo Baldi in BBC Radio 4's Baldi. He also read Joseph Conrad's Heart of Darkness for a radio adaptation. In 1980, he played Smike in the eight-hour stage version of The Life and Adventures of Nicholas Nickleby for the Royal Shakespeare Company in both London and New York.

Other notable stage performances include Riddley Walker, Oedipus, Macbeth, Your Home In The West and Peer Gynt at the Royal Exchange Theatre, Manchester, Bolingbroke in Richard II and Orgon in Tartuffe at the National Theatre in London. Threlfall played Jack in When the Whales Came (1989), opposite Paul Scofield and Helen Mirren. In 2010, he appeared as a guest on Have I Got News for You.

In 2013, he played retired London detective Len Harper in the short murder mystery BBC series What Remains alongside Russell Tovey and Amber Rose Revah.

In March 2016, he appeared as the lead in Don Quixote, at the Swan Theatre, Stratford for the Royal Shakespeare Company. The play was revived in 2018 at the Garrick Theatre in London.

Awards and honours
Threlfall was awarded an Honorary Doctorate from Manchester Metropolitan University on 15 July 2013. An Honorary Doctorate from Sheffield Hallam University in 2014. He has a SWET (Olivier) Award, a TONY and EMMY Nomination, The Clarence Derwent Award, 5 RTS Awards and a BAFTA for Housewife49 with Victoria Wood.

Personal life
Threlfall has been married to Bosnian actress Brana Bajic since 1995. They met in 1994, whilst working on The Count of Monte Cristo at the Royal Exchange Theatre in Manchester. They have two children.

Threlfall has said that despite his Shameless character being a chain smoker, in real life he is a non-smoker who has a dislike for nicotine.

Filmography

Film

Television

Theatre

 Blackie, The Sons of Light by David Rudkin for the Royal Shakespeare Company at The Other Place, Stratford-upon-Avon (1977)
 Jake, A&R by Pete Atkin for the Royal Shakespeare Company at the Warehouse Theatre, London (1978)
 Fitz, Savage Amusement by Peter Flannery for the Royal Shakespeare Company at the Warehouse Theatre, London (1978)
 Mike, Shout Across The River by Stephen Poliakoff for the Royal Shakespeare Company at the Warehouse Theatre, London (1978)
 Mark Antony, Julius Caesar at the Royal Shakespeare Theatre, Stratford-upon-Avon (1979)
 Slender, The Merry Wives of Windsor at the Royal Shakespeare Theatre, Stratford-upon-Avon (1979)
 Viktor, The Suicide by Nikolai Erdman for the Royal Shakespeare Company at The Other Place, Stratford-upon-Avon (1979)
 Smike, The Life and Adventures of Nicholas Nickleby adapted by David Edgar for the Royal Shakespeare Company at the Aldwych Theatre, London and then at the Plymouth Theatre, New York (1980)
 Bolingbroke, Richard II at the Royal National Theatre, London (1985)
 Riddley Walker, Riddley Walker by Russell Hoban at the Royal Exchange, Manchester (1986)
 Hamlet for the Oxford Playhouse at the Edinburgh Festival (1986)
Oedipus, Oedipus by Sophocles at the Royal Exchange, Manchester (1987)
 The Traveller by Jean Claude Van Itallie at the Haymarket Theatre, Leicester and then the Almeida (1987)
 Macbeth, Macbeth at the Royal Exchange, Manchester (1988)
 Bussy D'Ambois by George Chapman at the Old Vic (1988)
 Ian, Over a Barrel by Stephen Bill, Palace Theatre, Watford (1989)
 Gregers Werle, The Wild Duck by Henrik Ibsen at the Phoenix Theatre, London (1990)
 Micky, Your Home in the West by Rod Wooden at the Royal Exchange, Manchester (1991)
 The Count, The Count of Monte Cristo at the Royal Exchange, Manchester (1994)
 Lovborg, Hedda Gabler by Henrik Ibsen at the Chichester Festival Theatre (1996)
 The Count, The Rehearsal by Jean Anouilh at the Criterion Center (1996)
 Norman Nestor, Odysseus Thump by Richard Hope at the West Yorkshire Playhouse, Leeds (1997)
 Garry Essendine, Present Laughter by Noël Coward at the Royal Exchange, Manchester (1998)
 Peer Gynt by Henrik Ibsen at the Royal Exchange, Manchester (1999)
 Orgon, Tartuffe by Moliere at the National Theatre, London (2002)
 Robert, Blue/Orange by Joe Penhall at the Duchess Theatre, London (2001)
 Skellig by David Almond at the Young Vic, London (2003)
 Michael, Someone Who'll Watch Over Me by Frank McGuiness at the Ambassadors Theatre, London (2005)
 Don Quixote, Don Quixote adapted by James Fenton from the novel by Miguel de Cervantes at the Swan Theatre, Stratford-upon-Avon (2016)
 Cream, The Old Tune (Beckett Triple Bill) at Jermyn Street Theatre, directed by Trevor Nunn (2019)
 Harry Wade, Hangmen by Martin McDonagh at the John Golden Theatre (2022)

References

External links

1953 births
Male actors from Manchester
Alumni of Manchester Metropolitan University
English male film actors
English male stage actors
English male television actors
People from Crumpsall
Living people
Royal Shakespeare Company members